Nyctonympha annulata is a species of beetle in the family Cerambycidae. It was described by Per Olof Christopher Aurivillius in 1900. It is known from Panama and Venezuela.

References

Forsteriini
Beetles described in 1900